Zhang Weiwei is a Chinese political scientist and writer, a professor of international relations at Fudan University, and the director of the China Institute of this university. Zhang is also an Internet celebrity, spreading his political ideas through online video platforms such as Xigua Video, Bilibili, TikTok and YouTube.

Early life
Zhang is the youngest of six siblings in his family. During the Cultural Revolution (1966-1976), his older siblings all went to the Xinjiang Production and Construction Corps while he stayed in Shanghai because of a policy. In 1975, at the age of 17, he was recruited into the No.2 Shanghai Carving Factory (上海雕刻二厂) as a worker and jade carving apprentice.

Education
Soon after, the college entrance examinations resumed with the end of the Cultural Revolution, and in 1977 Zhang was admitted to the foreign languages department of Fudan University, where he persuaded the dean to sit in on courses in international politics. From 1981 to 1983, Zhang was a postgraduate student at Beijing Foreign Studies University, studying translation.

In 1988, Zhang went to the University of Geneva's Graduate Institute of International Studies for a master's degree in international relations (1990) and then pursued a PhD, which he received in 1994. The title of his doctoral thesis is Ideological Trends and Economic Reform in China, (1978-1993).

Career

Interpreter 
From 1983 to 1988, Zhang was an English interpreter of the Chinese Foreign Ministry, worked for some Chinese leaders, including Deng Xiaoping and Li Peng, in the mid-1980s. In 1999, he published China's first monograph on English-Chinese simultaneous interpretation.

Academia 
He was a senior fellow at the Centre for Asian Studies, Graduate Institute of International and Development Studies (1998-2010), and a visiting professor at the Geneva School of Diplomacy and International Relations (2004-2010).

Zhang has written extensively in English and Chinese on People's Republic of China's economic and political reform, China's development model and comparative politics. He expanded on the concept of a civilization state with his book The China Wave: Rise of a Civilizational State (2012).

Zhang Weiwei first predicted Arab Winter in his June 2011 debate with Francis Fukuyama, who believed Arab Spring might be spread to China. "My understanding of the Middle East leads me to conclude that the West should not be too happy. It will bring enormous problems to American interest. It is called 'Arab Spring' for now, and I guess it will soon turn to be the winter for the Middle East."

Politics 
Zhang is a high-ranking ideologist in the Chinese Communist Party (CCP).

On May 17, 2016, Zhang attended the National Symposium on the Work of Philosophy and Social Sciences chaired by Xi Jinping and spoke as a representative of the field of political science on topics such as theoretical innovation, Chinese discourse and a new type of think tank.

On May 31, 2021, Zhang gave a lecture to the Politburo of the CCP on strengthening China's international propaganda. Some commentators have therefore argued that Zhang has become the new Guoshi (国师), a person with the ability to influence the decisions of China's political elites.

TV 
Since 2019, Zhang has been the host of "This is China" (这就是中国), a Chinese political talk show launched by Dragon Television, a state-owned TV channel.

Political Views 

According to Zhang, the concept of political party in the Western context does not apply to the CCP. The CCP is a ruling group that follows Chinese political traditions and represents the interests of a nation as a whole.

Affiliations 
 Zhang is the director of the Institute of China Studies, Shanghai Academy of Social Science.
 Zhang is a Senior research fellow at the Chunqiu Institute, a Shanghai-based think tank.

Works

Books

Articles
Zhang, W. (2005). Overseas Chinese and the Concept of "Greater China". Refugee Survey Quarterly, 24(4), 65-73.
Zhang, W. (2006). Long-term Outlook for China’s Political Reform. Asia Europe Journal, 4(2), 151-175.

Essays

External links 
 Zhang's channel on YouTube
 Zhang's column in Guancha, a Chinese website on politics and current affairs.

References

Living people
Academic staff of Fudan University
1958 births
Chinese political scientists
Fudan University alumni
Chinese Internet celebrities
Writers from Shanghai
Educators from Shanghai
Beijing Foreign Studies University alumni
University of Geneva alumni
Graduate Institute of International and Development Studies alumni
Chinese YouTubers
YouTubers from Shanghai
Interpreters
Chinese international relations scholars